Jack Parker (born 1885) was a British cinematographer and cameraman. He worked on a mixture of features and documentary films during his career. In the 1930s he worked on a number of BIP and Butcher's Film Service productions, while in the 1940s he was employed as a cameraman on Ealing Studios films.

Selected filmography

Cinematographer
 All Roads Lead to Calvary (1921)
 The House of Peril (1922)
 Nelson (1926)
 Boadicea (1927)
 The Battles of Coronel and Falkland Islands (1927)
 The Celestial City (1929)
 Windjammer (1930)
 Dance Pretty Lady (1931)
 Tell England (1931)
 Carnival (1931)
 Strictly Business (1931)
 Men Like These (1932)
 The Bad Companions (1932)
 On Secret Service (1933)
 Meet My Sister (1933)
 The Warren Case (1934)
 Lost in the Legion (1934)
 The Outcast (1934)
 The Return of Bulldog Drummond (1934)
 Dandy Dick (1935)
 Sweeney Todd (1936)
 The End of the Road (1936)
 Hearts of Humanity (1936)
 Men of Yesterday (1936)
 Variety Parade (1936)
 Annie Laurie (1936)
 Well Done, Henry (1936)
 Love Up the Pole (1936)
 Hot News (1936)
 Sunshine Ahead (1936)
 Accused (1936)
 Wanted! (1937)
 Rose of Tralee (1937)
 The Academy Decides (1937)
 The Schooner Gang (1937)
 Talking Feet (1937)
 The Elder Brother (1937)
 Sing as You Swing (1937)
 Stepping Toes (1938)

Cameraman
 The Missing Million (1942)
 Gert and Daisy Clean Up (1942)
 Dead of Night (1945)

References

Bibliography 
 Anthony Slide. Fifty Classic British Films, 1932–1982: A Pictorial Record. Courier Corporation, 1985.

External links 
 

1885 births
Year of death unknown
British cinematographers